Khosrow Jamshidi is an Iranian hematologist who invented the Jamshidi needle used for bone marrow biopsy.

References

Iranian hematologists
Iranian medical researchers
Living people
Year of birth missing (living people)
Place of birth missing (living people)